Constituent Assembly slections were held in Uganda on 28 March 1994 to elect 214 of the 284 members of an Assembly tasked with drawing up the country's new constitution. Although all candidates formally ran as independents, it was estimated that 146 of the 214 elected members were representatives of the National Resistance Movement, while the other 68 members viewed as being members of the opposition (the Conservative Party, Democratic Party, National Liberal Party and the Uganda People's Congress) formed the National Caucus for Democracy. A further 70 members were appointed, with each registered political party nominating two members and each of the 39 districts nominating a female representative. A further ten members were nominated by the Army, four by the National Youth Council, two by the National Organization of Trade Unions and one by the National Union of Disabled People.

Following the promulgation of the new constitution, presidential and parliamentary elections were held in 1996.

Results

References

1994 in Uganda
Elections in Uganda
Uganda
Non-partisan elections